Edward Paul Hernández (born October 17, 1957) is an American politician who previously served in the California State Senate. A Democrat, he represented the 22nd Senate district, which includes the San Gabriel Valley cities of Alhambra, Azusa, Baldwin Park, Covina, La Puente, San Gabriel, and West Covina. Prior to the 2014 redistricting, he represented the 24th Senate district.

Hernandez is a member of the California Latino Legislative Caucus. An optometrist, he currently serves as the Chair of the Senate Committee on Health. Prior to his election to the State Senate in 2010, he served in the California State Assembly, representing the 57th Assembly district from 2006 until 2010.

In 2016, Hernandez announced that he would run to replace Gavin Newsom as lieutenant governor in 2018. In the 2018 general election, Hernandez was defeated by former U.S. Ambassador to Hungary Eleni Kounalakis.

Personal life and career 
Hernández, a grandson of immigrants is a native of La Puente and he graduated from Bassett High School.  Hernández earned his B.A. degree from California State University, Fullerton and he earned his O.D. degree from Indiana University. In 2000 and 2001, Hernández served as president of the California Optometric Association.  Prior to serving in the Assembly, he was President of the California Board of Optometry.

Hernández is married to Diane, also an optometrist.  He has one daughter from that marriage, and one from a previous marriage. The Hernández family resides in Azusa.

Legislative career 
Hernández chaired the Senate Health Committee between 2011 and 2017. He was the primary author for various laws affecting healthcare which were passed and codified in the California Health and Safety Code.

He was also involved in implementing the federal Patient Protection and Affordable Care Act.

2010 election

In 2010, Hernández ran a successful campaign for the California State Senate, to represent the 22nd Senate district. He was reelected to the Senate in 2014, and was a candidate for lieutenant governor in 2018.

SCA 5 
Hernández authored and introduced Senate Constitutional Amendment No.5 (SCA5), which proposed an amendment to the Constitution of the State to repeal portions of California Proposition 209, in order to allow the State of California to consider race in student admissions. It was passed in the California Senate on Jan. 30, 2014.  Proposition 209 prohibits state government institutions from considering race, sex, or ethnicity, specifically in the areas of public employment, public contracting, and public education. Proposition 209 is considered by others to be a proposition which has resulted in low minority enrollment, and to have been driven by racial divisions. However, following resistance from various citizen groups, including Asian American groups, Senator Hernandez withdrew his measure from consideration.

External links 
 Campaign website
 Twitter
 Facebook
 Join California Ed Hernandez

References

|-

|-

1957 births
21st-century American politicians
American optometrists
American politicians of Mexican descent
Hispanic and Latino American state legislators in California
Democratic Party California state senators
California State University, Fullerton alumni
Indiana State University alumni
Democratic Party members of the California State Assembly
Living people
People from Montebello, California
People from West Covina, California
Politicians from Los Angeles